Victor Chukuma Johnson (11 May 1944 – 15 July 2012) was a Sierra Leonean entrepreneur  and politician who was the  deputy leader and chairman of the All People's Congress between 2004 and 20012. He also held the position of  deputy speaker of parliament of Sierra Leone in the erstwhile government of Ernest Bai Koroma. He had also served as chairman of the Freetown City Council Committee of Management.

Biography 
Born and raised in Waterloo in the capital Freetown to Creole parents Caleb Ethelbert Johnson and Ekundayo Marian Johnson, Johnson attended W.A.M Collegiate Secondary School  before majoring in finance.

He was a member of the Sierra Leone Parliament from the Western Area Rural District, representing  constituency 94, which is mainly made up of the neighbourhood of Waterloo in Freetown. Johnson was first elected a member of parliament in the 2002 Sierra Leone Parliamentary elections.

He was the recipient of the Commander of the Order of the Republic of Sierra Leone (CRSL), awarded in May 2012 by the President in recognition of his distinguished and dedicated service to the nation, in the areas of general commerce, public service and politics.

References

1951 births
 2012 deaths
21st-century Sierra Leonean politicians
All People's Congress politicians
Fourah Bay College alumni
People from Freetown
Sierra Leone Creole people
Sierra Leonean Christians
Speakers of the Parliament of Sierra Leone